The 2008 Spanish general election was held on Sunday, 9 March 2008, to elect the 9th Cortes Generales of the Kingdom of Spain. All 350 seats in the Congress of Deputies were up for election, as well as 208 of 264 seats in the Senate.

After four years of growing bipolarisation of Spanish politics, the election saw a record result for both ruling Spanish Socialist Workers' Party (PSOE) and opposition People's Party (PP), together obtaining more than 83% of the vote share—over 21 million votes—and 92% of the Congress seats. The PSOE under José Luis Rodríguez Zapatero benefitted from tactical voting against the PP and emerged as the most-voted party just 7 seats short of an overall majority. On the other hand, Mariano Rajoy's PP saw an increase in its vote share and seat count but remained unable to overtake the Socialists.

United Left (IU) had its worst general election performance ever with less than 4% and 2 seats. Regional nationalist parties Convergence and Union (CiU), Republican Left of Catalonia (ERC), Basque Nationalist Party (PNV) or Aragonese Union (CHA) were also hurt by the massive tactical voting towards the PSOE, falling to historical lows of popular support. Union, Progress and Democracy (UPyD), with 1 seat and slightly more than 300,000 votes, became the first nationwide party aside from PSOE, PP and IU entering in parliament in over two decades.

Zapatero was sworn in as Prime Minister of Spain for a second term in office in April 2008, just as the Spanish economy began showing signs of fatigue and economic slowdown after a decade of growth.

Overview

Electoral system
The Spanish Cortes Generales were envisaged as an imperfect bicameral system. The Congress of Deputies had greater legislative power than the Senate, having the ability to vote confidence in or withdraw it from a prime minister and to override Senate vetoes by an absolute majority of votes. Nonetheless, the Senate possessed a few exclusive (yet limited in number) functions—such as its role in constitutional amendment—which were not subject to the Congress' override. Voting for the Cortes Generales was on the basis of universal suffrage, which comprised all nationals over 18 years of age and in full enjoyment of their political rights.

For the Congress of Deputies, 348 seats were elected using the D'Hondt method and a closed list proportional representation, with an electoral threshold of three percent of valid votes—which included blank ballots—being applied in each constituency. Seats were allocated to constituencies, corresponding to the provinces of Spain, with each being allocated an initial minimum of two seats and the remaining 248 being distributed in proportion to their populations. Ceuta and Melilla were allocated the two remaining seats, which were elected using plurality voting. The use of the D'Hondt method might result in a higher effective threshold, depending on the district magnitude.

As a result of the aforementioned allocation, each Congress multi-member constituency was entitled the following seats:

For the Senate, 208 seats were elected using an open list partial block voting system, with electors voting for individual candidates instead of parties. In constituencies electing four seats, electors could vote for up to three candidates; in those with two or three seats, for up to two candidates; and for one candidate in single-member districts. Each of the 47 peninsular provinces was allocated four seats, whereas for insular provinces, such as the Balearic and Canary Islands, districts were the islands themselves, with the larger—Majorca, Gran Canaria and Tenerife—being allocated three seats each, and the smaller—Menorca, Ibiza–Formentera, Fuerteventura, La Gomera, El Hierro, Lanzarote and La Palma—one each. Ceuta and Melilla elected two seats each. Additionally, autonomous communities could appoint at least one senator each and were entitled to one additional senator per each million inhabitants.

Election date
The term of each chamber of the Cortes Generales—the Congress and the Senate—expired four years from the date of their previous election, unless they were dissolved earlier. The election decree was required to be issued no later than the twenty-fifth day prior to the date of expiry of the Cortes in the event that the prime minister did not make use of his prerogative of early dissolution. The decree was to be published on the following day in the Official State Gazette (BOE), with election day taking place on the fifty-fourth day from publication. The previous election was held on 14 March 2004, which meant that the legislature's term would expire on 14 March 2008. The election decree was required to be published in the BOE no later than 19 February 2008, with the election taking place on the fifty-fourth day from publication, setting the latest possible election date for the Cortes Generales on Sunday, 13 April 2008.

The prime minister had the prerogative to dissolve both chambers at any given time—either jointly or separately—and call a snap election, provided that no motion of no confidence was in process, no state of emergency was in force and that dissolution did not occur before one year had elapsed since the previous one. Additionally, both chambers were to be dissolved and a new election called if an investiture process failed to elect a prime minister within a two-month period from the first ballot. Barred this exception, there was no constitutional requirement for simultaneous elections for the Congress and the Senate. Still, as of  there has been no precedent of separate elections taking place under the 1978 Constitution.

The Cortes Generales were dissolved on 15 January 2008, after it was announced by Andalusian president Manuel Chaves in November 2007 that he had agreed with Zapatero to hold the 2008 Spanish general election and the regional election in Andalusia simultaneously on 9 March.

Parliamentary composition
The Cortes Generales were officially dissolved on 15 January 2008, after the publication of the dissolution decree in the Official State Gazette. The tables below show the composition of the parliamentary groups in both chambers at the time of dissolution.

Parties and candidates
The electoral law allowed for parties and federations registered in the interior ministry, coalitions and groupings of electors to present lists of candidates. Parties and federations intending to form a coalition ahead of an election were required to inform the relevant Electoral Commission within ten days of the election call, whereas groupings of electors needed to secure the signature of at least one percent of the electorate in the constituencies for which they sought election, disallowing electors from signing for more than one list of candidates.

Below is a list of the main parties and electoral alliances which contested the election:

In the Canary Islands, an alliance was formed between New Canaries (NC) and Nationalist Canarian Centre (CCN), two splinter groups from Canarian Coalition. In the Valencian Community, Valencian People's Initiative (IdPV)—splinter from United Left of the Valencian Country (EUPV)—joined a coalition with the Valencian Nationalist Bloc (Bloc) and The Greens–Ecologist Left of the Valencian Country (EVEE). Unity for the Isles, an electoral alliance based in the Balearic Islands, was formed by PSM–Nationalist Agreement (PSM–EN), Majorcan Union (UM), Republican Left of Catalonia (ERC), Agreement for Majorca (ExM) and The Greens of Menorca (EV–Me).

Timetable
The key dates are listed below (all times are CET. Note that the Canary Islands use WET (UTC+0) instead):

14 January: The election decree is issued with the countersign of the Prime Minister after deliberation in the Council of Ministers, ratified by the King.
15 January: Formal dissolution of the Cortes Generales and official start of ban period for the organization of events for the inauguration of public works, services or projects.
18 January: Initial constitution of provincial and zone electoral commissions.
25 January: Deadline for parties and federations intending to enter in coalition to inform the relevant electoral commission.
4 February: Deadline for parties, federations, coalitions and groupings of electors to present lists of candidates to the relevant electoral commission.
6 February: Submitted lists of candidates are provisionally published in the Official State Gazette (BOE).
9 February: Deadline for citizens entered in the Register of Absent Electors Residing Abroad (CERA) and for citizens temporarily absent from Spain to apply for voting.
10 February: Deadline for parties, federations, coalitions and groupings of electors to rectify irregularities in their lists.
11 February: Official proclamation of valid submitted lists of candidates.
12 February: Proclaimed lists are published in the BOE.
22 February: Official start of electoral campaigning.
28 February: Deadline to apply for postal voting.
4 March: Official start of legal ban on electoral opinion polling publication, dissemination or reproduction and deadline for CERA citizens to vote by mail.
5 March: Deadline for postal and temporarily absent voters to issue their votes.
7 March: Last day of official electoral campaigning and deadline for CERA citizens to vote in a ballot box in the relevant consular office or division.
8 March: Official 24-hour ban on political campaigning prior to the general election (reflection day).
9 March: Polling day (polling stations open at 9 am and close at 8 pm or once voters present in a queue at/outside the polling station at 8 pm have cast their vote). Counting of votes starts immediately.
12 March: General counting of votes, including the counting of CERA votes.
15 March: Deadline for the general counting of votes to be carried out by the relevant electoral commission.
24 March: Deadline for elected members to be proclaimed by the relevant electoral commission.
3 April: Deadline for both chambers of the Cortes Generales to be re-assembled (the election decree determines this date, which for the 2008 election was set for 1 April).
3 May: Maximum deadline for definitive results to be published in the BOE.

Campaign

Party slogans

Although the official electoral campaign period in Spain only lasts for the 15 days before the election, (with the exception of the day just before the election), many parties, especially the PP and PSOE, start their "pre-campaigns" months in advance, often before having finalised their electoral lists.

PSOE
The first phase campaign was done under the slogan "Con Z de Zapatero" (With Z of Zapatero), a joke based on the Prime Minister and socialist candidate's habit of tending to pronounce words ending with D as if they ended with Z. The campaign was linked to terms like equality (Igualdad-Igualdaz) or solidarity (Solidaridad-Solidaridaz), emphasizing the policies carried out by the current government. The second phase was done under the slogan "La Mirada Positiva" (The Positive outlook), emphasising the future government platform, and "Vota con todas tus fuerzas" (Vote with all of your strength), aiming to mobilize the indecisive or potentially abstaining voters. Another common slogan through all the campaign was "Motivos para creer" (Reasons to believe in).

PP
For the pre-campaign the PP used the slogan "Con Rajoy es Posible" (With Rajoy it's Possible). Usually emphasizing PP's campaign proposals, such as "Llegar a fin de mes, Con Rajoy es Posible" (Making ends meet, With Rajoy it's Possible). IU accused PP of copying its slogan from the last municipal elections

IU
IU chose the pre-campaign slogan "LlamazarES + Más Izquierda" (LlamazarES (is) More Left), calling attention to their position as the third national party.

Campaign issues

The economy became a major campaign issue due to a number of factors:

 A slowing down in the housing market, with prices even beginning to fall in some areas.
 Sharp increases in prices of some basic commodities.
 Global instability as a result of market uncertainty.
 A rise in unemployment.

The sudden emergence of the economy as a political issue came after several years of steady economic growth, and led some observers to suggest that maybe the government would have benefitted from calling an earlier election. In addition to those factors both the PP and the PSOE made competing proposals on taxation.

Election debates

Opinion polls

Opinion polls

Results

Congress of Deputies

Senate

Aftermath

Notes

References

External links
Election Guide- Spain Profile
NSD: European Election Database - Spain publishes regional level election data; allows for comparisons of election results, 1993–2008

General
2008 in Spain
2008
March 2008 events in Europe